The 1979 CONCACAF Champions' Cup was the 15th edition of the annual international club football competition held in the CONCACAF region (North America, Central America and the Caribbean), the CONCACAF Champions' Cup. It determined that year's club champion of association football in the CONCACAF region and was played from 20 May till 29 December 1979.

The teams were split in 3 zones (North American, Central American and Caribbean), each one qualifying the winner to the final tournament, where the winners of the North and Central zones played a semi-final to decide who was going to play against the Caribbean champion in the final. All the matches in the tournament were played under the home/away match system.

Salvadoran Club Deportivo FAS won the two-legged series final v Antillean team Jong Colombia (8–2 on aggregate), becoming CONCACAF champions for the first time in their history.

North American Zone

Tigres UANL advance to the CONCACAF Semifinal.

Central American Zone

Comunicaciones and Alianza withdrew.
FAS and Cartaginés advance to the second round.

Second round

FAS, won presumably by walkover and advance to the CONCACAF Semi-final.

Caribbean Zone

Preliminary round

Santos won, presumably by walkover and advances to the First round.

First round

 Leo Victor Robinhood Defence Force Tesoro Palo SecoReportedly these clubs entered the tournament; results from these matches are unknown.

Jong Holland and Jong Colombia advance to the second round.

Second round

Other fixtures (if any) not known.
Defence Force and Jong Colombia advance to the third round.

Third round

Jong Colombia advances to the fourth round (Final Round In The Caribbean Section).

Robin Hood wins and advances to the fourth round (Final Round In The Caribbean Section).

Fourth round

Jong Colombia is the Champions in the Caribbean Region and advances to the CONCACAF Champions Cup Final.

CONCACAF Final Series

Semi-final

First leg

Second leg

FAS won the series 1–0 on aggregate.

Final

Final

First leg

Second leg

FAS won the series 8–2 on aggregate.

Champion

References

1
CONCACAF Champions' Cup